The 10th (X) European Athletics Championships were held from 10 August to 15 August 1971 in the Olympic Stadium of Helsinki, the capital of Finland.  Contemporaneous reports on the event were given in the Glasgow Herald.

Men's results

Complete results were published.

Track
1966 |1969 |1971 |1974 |1978

Field
1966 |1969 |1971 |1974 |1978

Women's results

Track
1966 |1969 |1971 |1974 |1978

Field
1966 |1969 |1971 |1974 |1978

Medal table

Participation
According to an unofficial count, 871 athletes from 29 countries participated in the event, fourteen athletes more than the official number of 857 as published.

 (16)
 (16)
 (12)
 (32)
 (14)
 (68)
 (48)
 (67)
 (1)
 (4)
 (42)
 (3)
 (9)
 (47)
 (1)
 (1)
 (20)
 (30)
 (65)
 (5)
 (18)
 (84)
 (16)
 (43)
 (20)
 (9)
 (65)
 (88)
 (27)

References 

 
 

 
European Athletics Championships
European Athletics Championships
International athletics competitions hosted by Finland
International sports competitions in Helsinki
European Athletics Championships
1971 in European sport
August 1971 sports events in Europe
1970s in Helsinki
Athletics in Helsinki